
Year 572 (DLXXII) was a leap year starting on Friday (link will display the full calendar) of the Julian calendar. The denomination 572 for this year has been used since the early medieval period, when the Anno Domini calendar era became the prevalent method in Europe for naming years.

Events
By place
Byzantine Empire
Byzantine–Sassanid War of 572–591: Emperor Justin II refuses to pay the annual tribute to Khosrau I, putting an end to the 50-year peace treaty established ten years earlier. The Armenians are considered allies to the Byzantine Empire, and Justin sends a Byzantine army into Persian territory, besieging the fortress city of Nisibis (modern Turkey).

Europe
Siege of Pavia (569–572): King Alboin captures Ticinum (Pavia); after a siege the Byzantine garrison surrenders to the Lombards. The city is of strategic importance, lying at the rivers Po and Ticino, and becomes the capital of the Kingdom of the Lombards.
June 28 – Alboin, king of the Lombards, is murdered at Verona in his palace, at the instigation of his wife Rosamund (daughter of the Gepid king Cunimund), and her henchman, Helmechis (the king's squire); both flee to seek Byzantine protection in Ravenna. Alboin is succeeded as king by Cleph, who is not related by blood.

Britain
Theodric succeeds his brother Æthelric as king of Bernicia (southeastern Scotland). He rules until 579.

Asia
Taspar Qaghan succeeds his brother Muqan Qaghan as ruler (khagan) of the Turkic Khaganate (Central Asia). 
Bidatsu succeeds his father Kinmei and ascends to the throne of Japan as the 30th emperor.

Mesoamerica
Calakmul defeats Tikal, bringing an end to the First Tikal-Calakmul War.

Births 
Chen Shuda, Chinese statesman

Deaths 
June 28 – Alboin, king of the Lombards
Æthelric of Bernicia, Scottish king
Báetán mac Muirchertaig, High King of Ireland
Corippus, Byzantine epic poet (approximate date)
Eochaid mac Domnaill, High King of Ireland
Hulü Guang, general of Northern Qi (b. 515)
Liuva I, king of the Visigoths (or 571) 
Muqan Qaghan, ruler of the Göktürks
Waldrada, Lombard princess (b. 531)
Wei Shou, Chinese author (b. 506)
Yuwen Hu, regent of Northern Zhou (b. 515)
Sky Witness, ruler of Calakmul

References